"Llévame" is a song by Colombian-American latin pop singer-songwriter Soraya. The song was released as the lead single from her fifth and final studio album El Otro Lado de Mi. The song was written, recorded and produced by Soraya.

Track listing

Chart performance

References

2005 singles
2005 songs
Capitol Latin singles
Songs written by Soraya (musician)
Soraya (musician) songs